Linden is a town in and the county seat of Perry County, Tennessee, United States. The population was 1,015 at the 2000 census and 908 at the 2010 showing a loss of 107. Linden was officially incorporated in 1850.

Linden is served by Perry County Airport, located 3.5 miles to the southwest.

Linden is named after the Thomas Campbell poem, "The Battle of Hohenlinden." Linden, Texas was in turn then named after the Tennessee town.

Geography
Linden is located at  (35.612168, -87.841601).

Climate

Demographics

2020 census

As of the 2020 United States census, there were 997 people, 468 households, and 257 families residing in the town.

2000 census
As of the census of 2000, there were 1,015 people, 400 households, and 233 families residing in the town. The population density was 1,040.9 people per square mile (399.9/km2). There were 461 housing units at an average density of 472.8 per square mile (181.6/km2). The racial makeup of the town was 93.0%White, 5.52% African American, 0.49% Native American, 0.20% Asian, and 0.49% from two or more races. Hispanic or Latino of any race were 0.39% of the population.

There were 400 households, out of which 26.3% had children under the age of 18 living with them, 44.0% were married couples living together, 12.3% had a female householder with no husband present, and 41.8% were non-families. 37.5% of all households were made up of individuals, and 24.0% had someone living alone who was 65 years of age or older. The average household size was 2.25 and the average family size was 2.97.

In the town, the age distribution of the population shows 22.6% under the age of 18, 6.6% from 18 to 24, 21.3% from 25 to 44, 19.6% from 45 to 64, and 30.0% who were 65 years of age or older. The median age was 45 years. For every 100 females, there were 76.2 males. For every 100 females age 18 and over, there were 69.8 males.

The median income for a household in the town was $25,134, and the median income for a family was $31,000. Males had a median income of $24,500 versus $21,063 for females. The per capita income for the town was $19,410. About 16.8% of families and 23.9% of the population were below the poverty line, including 27.5% of those under age 18 and 23.1% of those age 65 or over.

Notable people
Bob Harris (basketball) – Fort Wayne Pistons and Boston Celtics.
Clyde Milan – An outfielder with the Washington Senators from 1907 to 1922.
Horace Milan –  a Washington Senators baseball player who played outfielder from 1915 to 1917.

References

External links

Town of Linden
Town charter
Perry County Chamber of Commerce
US election 2016 Did 'socialism' save this US town? - BBC News
 Commodore Hotel Linden

Towns in Perry County, Tennessee
Towns in Tennessee
County seats in Tennessee